Sainey Nyassi (born January 31, 1989) is a Gambian professional footballer who plays as a midfielder.

Club career
Sainey Nyassi began his career in the Gambia, playing in the GFA League First Division for Gambia Ports Authority.

Nyassi was scouted by New England Revolution head coach Steve Nicol while playing in the 2007 FIFA U-20 World Cup, and signed with the Revolution shortly thereafter along with his Gambian teammate, Kenny Mansally. He made his MLS debut on September 9, 2007 against D.C. United as a substitute, playing the final eight minutes on the right wing. He made his first start and scored his first MLS goal on March 29, 2008 in the Revs' 3-0 opening day victory over Houston Dynamo. Nyassi was released by New England on May 16, 2013.

On May 27, 2013, Nyassi signed with D.C. United.

On June 9, 2014, Nyassi signed for Finnish Club RoPS.

Nyassi signed with FC Edmonton in February 2015. He spent three seasons in Edmonton. After the 2017 season, with the future of FC Edmonton and the NASL in doubt, Nyassi was released by the club.

International career
Nyassi has represented his nation at various youth levels. He played for the Gambian U-17 national team in the 2005 U-17 world championships, and for the U-20 national team in the 2007 U-20 FIFA Championships.  He scored his first goal for the Senior national team on September 4, 2010 in the 2012 Africa Cup of Nations qualification match against Namibia.

International goals
Scores and results list Gambia's goal tally first.

Personal life
Sainey is the twin brother of fellow professional footballer Sanna Nyassi.

Nyassi received his U.S green card on January 31, 2012, which qualified him as a domestic player for MLS roster purposes.

References

External links
 
 

1989 births
Living people
Association football midfielders
Gambian footballers
The Gambia international footballers
The Gambia youth international footballers
New England Revolution players
D.C. United players
Rovaniemen Palloseura players
FC Edmonton players
Gambian twins
Identical twins
Gambian expatriate footballers
Expatriate soccer players in the United States
Expatriate footballers in Finland
Expatriate soccer players in Canada
Major League Soccer players
Veikkausliiga players
North American Soccer League players
Gambian expatriates in the United States
Gambia Ports Authority FC players